Daniel Mack was a soldier from the 365th Infantry Regiment an all-Black unit that fought with honours in World War I. He was lynched but survived
 during the Red Summer a period of racial violence in America.

365th Infantry Regiment

The 92nd Division was first constituted on paper 24 October 1917 in the National Army, over six months after the U.S. entry into World War I.  The division was commanded throughout most of its existence by Major General Charles C. Ballou and was composed of the 183rd Infantry Brigade with the 365th and 366th Infantry Regiments, and the 184th Infantry Brigade with the 367th and 368th Infantry Regiments, together with supporting artillery, engineer, medical and signal units attached. The division was organized on 27 October 1917 at Camp Funston, Kansas, the men first being trained at the regimental level. For this division, 104 black captains, 397 first lieutenants, and 125 second lieutenants were trained at a "negro officers' camp" in Des Moines, Iowa.  A special "negro zone" was to be built at the east end of Camp Funston, with "separate amusement places and exchanges. "A.D. Jellison, a banker of Junction City, Kansas, gave a plot of land for a "community house," to be erected by the black men from the seven states which sent African-American trainees.

Lynching
Daniel Mack returned from the First World War and was hesitant to tolerate the Jim Crow south.  During an April 5, 1919, market day in Sylvester, Georgia, Mack was walking through a busy street and brushed against a white man. The white man was offended that Mack didn't show the proper amount of respect and the two got in a scuffle. Police came on the scene and promptly arrested Mack for assault. During the trial, he was sentenced to 30 days in prison. A few days into his sentence, on April 14, a white mob broke into the prison, took him out into the wilderness and lynched Mack. He played dead and he was left for dead. No arrests were ever made.

Bibliography 
Notes

References 
 

    

United States Army personnel of World War I
United States Army soldiers 
African Americans in World War I
Recipients of the Médaille militaire (France)
African-American United States Army personnel